Paul Friedrich Posenenske (9 September 1919 in Wroclaw - April 2004) was a German architect of functionalism.

Life 

Posenenske studied from 1936 to 1941 at the Technical University of Wroclaw and at the Technical University Berlin and has worked since 1945 in various state building departments of Hesse. There, he designed especially public building, which are characterized by a very complex modernity. In many buildings, artists were involved, for art and for the color scheme. The dormitories in Frankfurt, however, were very purist and followed the forms which were introduced by Ferdinand Kramer at the Frankfurt University.

From 1958 he was a professor at the State Academy of Fine Arts in Kassel (today part of University of Kassel). In the same year he set up his own architectural offices in Offenbach am Main and Kassel. The transformation of the 18th-century architecture Schloss Wilhelmshöhe with a deliberately avant-garde interior design into a modern museum was citisized heavily by traditionalists.

Paul Friedrich Posenenske was married with the painter and sculptor Charlotte Posenenske. In 1987 he moved with his wife to Pottum Westerwald, where he worked and lived until his death.

Works (selection) 
 Mourning Hall, Gross-Gerau (1952-1953)
 House Schneidhain in Königstein Ts. (1952-1954)
 Reconstruction of Isenburg castle, Offenbach (1952-1956)
 Humboldt School, Offenbach (1952-1957)
 Elementary school, Zeppelinheim (1953-1954)
 German Weather Service, Offenbach (1955-1957, later demolished)
 Kunsthochschule Kassel (Academy of Fine Arts Kassel), now part of University of Kassel, (1960-1969)
 Reconstruction of the Schloss Wilhelmshöhe in Kassel (1961)
 Evangelical Church, Hassenroth (1961-1967)
 Dormitory Ginnheimer Landstrasse, Frankfurt (1962-1969)
 Cemetery hall Rumpenheim, Offenbach 1972
 Evangelical Lutheran St. Paul's Church, Burgdorf (1973)
 House Posenenske in Radfeldstr., Offenbach (1973)
 Condominium (from competition "Elementa 72"), Bonn 1972
 House in Pottum / Westerwald (1986-1987 renovation, honored as "House of the Year 1991")

1919 births
2004 deaths
20th-century German architects
Architects from Wrocław
Academic staff of the University of Kassel